The 2008 congressional elections in Louisiana to determine representation for the state of Louisiana in the United States House of Representatives occurred November 4, 2008. Louisiana has seven seats in the House, apportioned according to the 2000 United States Census. Representatives are elected for two-year terms; those elected will serve in the 111th Congress from January 4, 2009 until January 3, 2011. The election coincided with the 2008 U.S. presidential election.

The primary elections were to be held September 6, 2008, but were rescheduled for October 3, 2008 due to storm damage following Hurricane Gustav. The necessary party runoffs were held on November 4, the same date as the presidential election.  The general election for the House races was held December 6.

Overview

District 1

Republican incumbent Steve Scalise won against Democratic nominee Jim Harlan, a businessman. CQ Politics forecasted the race as 'Safe Republican'.

District 2 

The district included nearly all of New Orleans and some of its suburbs, and is heavily Democratic: John Kerry won 75% of the vote here in 2004. CQ Politics forecasted the race as "Safe Democrat" for 9-term incumbent William Jefferson, but the Republican narrowly defeated him in an upset.

The primary runoff in this district was held on November 4 in place of the general election, with the general election moving to December 6.

The investigation began in mid-2005, after an investor alleged $400,000 in bribes were paid through a company maintained in the name of his spouse and children. The money came from a tech company named iGate, Inc. of Louisville, Kentucky, and in return, it is alleged, Jefferson would help iGate's business. Jefferson was to persuade the U.S. Army to test iGate's broadband two-way technology and other iGate products; use his efforts to influence high-ranking officials in Nigeria, Ghana, and Cameroon; and meet with personnel of the Export-Import Bank of the United States, in order to facilitate potential financing for iGate business deals in those countries.

On July 30, 2005, Jefferson was videotaped by the FBI receiving $100,000 worth of $100 bills in a leather briefcase at the Ritz-Carlton hotel in Arlington, Virginia. Jefferson told an investor, Lori Mody, who was wearing a wire, that he would need to give Nigerian Vice President Atiku Abubakar $500,000 "as a motivating factor" to make sure they obtained contracts for iGate and Mody's company in Nigeria.

A few days later, on August 3, 2005, FBI agents raided Jefferson's home in Northeast Washington and, as noted in an 83-page affidavit filed to support a subsequent raid on his Congressional office, "found $90,000 of the cash in the freezer, in $10,000 increments wrapped in aluminum foil and stuffed inside frozen-food containers." Serial numbers found on the currency in the freezer matched serial numbers of funds given by the FBI to their informant.

Late on the night of May 20, 2006, FBI agents executed a search warrant at Jefferson's office in the Rayburn House Office Building. This is "believed to be the first-ever FBI raid on a Congressional office," raising concerns that it could "set a dangerous precedent that could be used by future administrations to intimidate or harass a supposedly coequal branch of the government."

The affidavit used to support these raids alleged:
The FBI videotaped Jefferson receiving a stock certificate from Mody for a company set up in Nigeria to promote iGate's technology. Jefferson predicted the deal would generate $200 million annually after five years.
Jefferson told Mody that he wanted a similar financial stake in the business in Ghana.
Jefferson sought $10 million in financing from Mody to take over iGate and install "confidants" on the new board. In two payments, Mody wired $89,225 to the ANJ Group LLC, a company controlled by Jefferson's family.
Jefferson lent $4,800 of the money Mody gave him to an unnamed congressional aide. Another $4,900 was given back to the FBI by one of Jefferson's attorneys.
The FBI claims it has uncovered "at least seven other schemes in which Jefferson sought things of value in return for his official acts."

Incumbent U.S. Representative William J. Jefferson won the Democratic primaries in Fall 2008. Jefferson had weathered a major challenge in the 2006 Louisiana 2nd congressional district election, when voters had fresh on their minds allegations that the representative had inappropriately used the services of a Louisiana Army National Guard unit in accessing his house during the aftermath of Hurricane Katrina.

By fall 2008 the incumbent faced longstanding federal charges of bribery involving Nigerian business interests and was perceived by some as vulnerable, with only 25 percent of Democrats voting for him in the first round of the 2008 Democratic primaries. Jefferson faced six African-American challengers along with newscaster Helena Moreno in the first primary, all of them clamoring for change from Louisiana's reputation for political corruption. Jefferson defeated Moreno by 57 percent to 43 percent in a runoff which went largely along racial lines. Moreno later endorsed Cao in the general election.  Cao, unopposed for the Republican nomination, was running against Jefferson, as were Green Party candidate Malik Rahim and Libertarian Party candidate Gregory Kahn. An earlier candidate, independent Jerry Jacobs, had withdrawn.

On November 30 the New Orleans Times-Picayune editorially endorsed Cao while on the op-ed page its columnist James Gill asserted that Jefferson's reelection "is not going to happen." The prospect of a serious general election in the majority African-American and heavily Democratic 2nd district was all the more startling in that the last Republican to represent the district was Hamilton D. Coleman, who left the office in 1891.  According to the Los Angeles Times, Cao, if elected, would become the first individual of Vietnamese extraction to serve in the U.S. Congress.

Cao's candidacy received the endorsement of the Alliance for Good Government, the Family Research Council's Action PAC, Louisiana Governor Bobby Jindal, and even entertainer Pat Boone. New Orleans Mayor Ray Nagin had announced his support for Jefferson during the Democratic primary elections. The New Orleans Gambit Weekly, citing its opposition to Jefferson's alleged corruption and Cao's noncommittal statements on embryonic stem-cell research, made no endorsement.

The days before the December 6 election were characterized by what Jefferson's campaign called "overly negative" tactics undertaken on behalf of Cao's campaign by outside organizations such as the National Republican Congressional Committee.  Besides references to Jefferson's removal from the House Ways and Means Committee by Democratic Speaker of the House Nancy Pelosi, the negative tactics included automated telephone calls from a woman identifying herself as "Katy" and citing incumbent Jefferson's federal indictment on 16 counts of corruption.  In a meeting of African-American ministers, the Reverend Samuel Butler said that the real reason for the negative campaign tactics was to disenfranchise African-American voters, which prompted Cao advisor and former New Orleans City Council member Bryan Wagner to assert that, "with Rev. Butler's imagination, he may want to go to work for Walt Disney."

On December 6, the Times-Picayune reiterated its endorsement of Cao, this time pointing to President-Elect Barack Obama's efforts on behalf of Democrat Paul Carmouche in the simultaneous election in Louisiana's 4th congressional district and Obama's non-involvement in efforts to support Jefferson.

On December 6 at 10:20 PM CST, CNN projected Cao the winner. Final unofficial results on the Louisiana Secretary of State's web site showed Cao with 33,122 (49.55%), Jefferson 31,296 (46.82%), Kahn 548 (0.82%), and Rahim 1,880 (2.81%). Jefferson won by 23,197 to 20,246 in Orleans Parish, where 21 of the 392 precincts showed zero votes for Cao, but Cao more than made up the difference with a margin 12,696 to the incumbent's 8,099 in Jefferson Parish.

District 3

Democratic incumbent Charlie Melancon ran unopposed for re-election. CQ Politics forecasted the race as 'Safe Democrat'.

District 4

The election was held on December 6, 2008.

Incumbent Jim McCrery retired, making this an open seat. The district contains northwestern Louisiana, including the cities of Shreveport, DeRidder, and Natchitoches. The district usually, but not reliably, votes Republican. Bill Clinton won it comfortably in 1996. CQ Politics''' forecast of the race was "No Clear Favorite".

The Republican nominee was physician John Fleming (campaign website) of Minden, the seat of Webster Parish. Fleming, a former Webster Parish coroner and a businessman defeated trucking company executive Chris Gorman in the Republican runoff primary held on November 4.

The Democratic candidate was Caddo Parish District Attorney Paul Carmouche (campaign website), who defeated African American attorney Willie Banks, Jr., in his party runoff on November 4. Republican candidate Jeff Thompson, despite being endorsed by Jim McCrery, was defeated in the first Republican primary, as were Democratic candidates Artis Cash and John Milkovich, later elected to the Louisiana State Senate. Patti Cox, local party organizer and environmental consultant and a 2006 candidate against McCrery, did not enter the 2008 race.

District 5

Republican incumbent Rodney Alexander was unopposed for re-election and won. CQ Politics forecasted the race as 'Safe Republican'.

District 6

Republican State Senator Bill Cassidy defeated Democratic incumbent Don Cazayoux in the November 4 election by a margin of 48%–40%.  Cazayoux had defeated Republican Woody Jenkins 49%–46% in a special election earlier in the year, and given his narrow margin of victory and the Republican-leaning nature of the district (Bush won 59% here in 2004), Cazayoux was, as expected, a GOP target as he sought his first full term.

State Representative Michael L. Jackson, who had run against Cazayoux in the Democratic primary in the special election, ran as an independent with funding from long-time Cassidy supporter Lane Grigsby. He finished third, garnering 36,133 votes, more than the 25,000-vote margin between Cassidy and Cazayoux, suggesting that he siphoned off many African-American votes that would have otherwise gone to Cazayoux and threw the election to Cassidy. The Daily Kingfish published photos of Jackson meeting with Congressman-elect Cassidy just three days after the election. Cazayoux was one of five incumbent House Democrats to be defeated in the 2008 congressional elections, along with Nancy Boyda (D-KS), William J. Jefferson (D-LA), Nick Lampson (D-TX), and Tim Mahoney (D-FL).

District 7

Republican incumbent Charles Boustany defeated Democratic State Senator Don Cravins, Jr. by a solid margin in this district based in southwestern Louisiana.

References

External links
Elections Division from the Louisiana Secretary of State 
U.S. Congress candidates for Louisiana at Project Vote Smart
Louisiana U.S. House Races from 2008 Race TrackerCampaign contributions for Louisiana congressional races from OpenSecrets
Louisiana Elections & Politics from The Times-Picayune'' newspaper

2008
Louisiana
United States House of Representatives